Gijs Leemreize (born 23 October 1999) is a Dutch professional racing cyclist who currently rides for UCI WorldTeam .

Career
Leemreize rode with UCI WorldTeam  as a development opportunity – following the introduction of a UCI rule permitting these – at the Tour de la Provence, in February. Following the announcement that he was joining the team full-time in 2021, Leemreize made a second appearance with the team at the Vuelta a Burgos. He was involved in a heavy crash on the first stage of the race; as a result of the crash, he severed a finger on his right hand and had to abandon the race. He was taken to hospital and underwent surgery on the hand later that day.

Major results
2019
 1st  Mountains classification Carpathian Couriers Race
2020
 5th Overall Ronde de l'Isard
2021
 1st  Overall Ronde de l'Isard
1st  Points classification
1st Stage 5
 4th Overall Tour de l'Avenir
1st Stage 2 (TTT)

Grand Tour general classification results timeline

Notes

References

External links
 

1999 births
Living people
Dutch male cyclists
People from Berkelland
Cyclists from Gelderland
21st-century Dutch people